Hartsville station, also known as the Hartsville Depot, is a historic train station located at Hartsville, Darlington County, South Carolina.  It was built in 1908 by the Atlantic Coast Line Railroad, and is a one-story structure typical of early 20th century railroad design. It has a hipped slate roof with a deep overhang supported by large wooden brackets. The Atlantic Coast Line discontinued this line to Hartsville in 1940, and in 1948 the station became the office for the Chairman of the Board of Directors of the Atlantic Coast Line Railroad Company.

It was listed on the National Register of Historic Places in 1976.

References

Railway stations on the National Register of Historic Places in South Carolina
Railway stations in the United States opened in 1908
Buildings and structures in Hartsville, South Carolina
National Register of Historic Places in Darlington County, South Carolina
1908 establishments in South Carolina
Former Atlantic Coast Line Railroad stations
Railway stations closed in 1940
Former railway stations in South Carolina